Niedrig und Kuhnt – Kommissare ermitteln is a German television series.

See also
List of German television series

External links
 

2003 German television series debuts
2014 German television series endings
German crime television series
2000s German police procedural television series
2010s German police procedural television series
German-language television shows
Sat.1 original programming